Chavva (Telugu చవ్వ) is a South Indian family surname.

In South Indian states like Andhra Pradesh, Karnataka and in few states in North India, people will have surname which is Hereditary. Right from hundreds of years people in that family will be getting same surname.

Chavva (చవ్వ) is mainly seen as surname of Andhra Pradesh people a South Indian state.
Their Mother tongue is Telugu language. These people are Hindus belonging to a caste called Reddy or Kapu once rich landlords and most are even now.

The people with this surname are mainly located in Kadapa District, Pulivendula Thaluka. A village called Himakuntla has nearly 70% of people with this surname. Its surrounding villages contain almost the same percentage of population with this surname. Now because of globalization the people with surname are scattered in many parts of the world. 
A Village called Chavva vari palli with the name of CHAVVA,located in Kadapa District, Pulivendula Thaluka has nearly 60% of people with this surname. Many are rich Chavva Balireddy,who was elected as MLA Of pulivendula constituency belongs to Y.Kothapalli of Simhadripuram mandal.

Telugu-language surnames